Kürdmaşı (also, Kyurdmashi, Kyurdmashy, and Kyurtmashi) is a village and municipality in the Ismailli Rayon of Azerbaijan.  It has a population of 2,997.

References 

Populated places in Ismayilli District